Ikram Khan is a famous singer from Rajasthan, India. He hails from a family of musicians belonging to the Sikar Gharana. He was initiated and groomed by his father, Ustad imamudeen Khan, who was also a very famous sarangi player from Jaipur. He uses thicker non-traditional strings on his sarangi, which gives his music a deep and unique tone.

Ikram-Ji began taking lessons from his uncle, Shri Gulab Khan, and Shri Liyakat Ali Khan of Mumbai. Influenced by Ustad Sultan Khan, he became a Gandha Bandhan Disciple in 1989. Since that time, Ikram Khan has accompanied many of the leading musicians of India including Kishan Maharaj, Gulkam Mustafa Khan, Rashid Khan, Ulhas Kashalkar, Ustad Sultan Khan, and Hidayat Khan and has achieved international recognition. Shri Ikram Khan has toured the United States, Europe, and  other countries to perform.

He is also a regular broadcaster on All India Radio and Doordarshan, and has been associated with All Radio Ahmedabad since 1989.

References

Hindustani instrumentalists
Living people
Indian Muslims
Musicians from Jaipur
Sarangi players
Year of birth missing (living people)